The geology of the Falkland Islands is described in several publications.  The Falkland Islands are located on a projection of the Patagonian continental shelf.  In ancient geological time this shelf was part of Gondwana, which around 400 million years ago broke from what is now Africa and drifted westwards relative to Africa.  Studies of the seabed surrounding the islands indicated the possibility of oil. Intensive exploration began in 1996, although there had been some earlier seismic surveys in the region.

Geological history

Proterozoic Eon and Paleozoic Era

The geological history of the Falkland Islands began more than thousand million years ago (Mya), before they existed as separate islands. From its earliest history the Falklands Islands has been linked to South America. Evidence from xenoliths suggests that the lithosphere of Deseado Massif in southern Patagonia formed 2100 to 1000 Mya in the Paleo and Mesoproterozoic. Since these times the Falklands Islands and Deseado Massif have formed a single tectonic block. Like today both regions were next to each other during the Neoproterozoic when they formed part of the ancient supercontinent of Rodinia.

About 290 million years ago, in the Carboniferous period, an ice age engulfed the area as glaciers advanced from the polar region, eroding and transporting rocks. These rocks were deposited as extensive moraines and glacial till. When the glacial sediments were turned into stone they formed the rocks that now make up the Fitzroy Tillite Formation in the Falklands. Identical rocks are found in southern Africa.

Mesozoic Era
The breakup of Gondwana in the Mesozoic Era led to the formation of a large number of minor crustal fragments, including the Falkland Islands. At first, the fragment containing the islands separated from the southeastern part of Africa on a section that would become Antarctica and later rotated by almost 180°. The interior of Gondwana was based on crystalline rocks more than a billion years old;  in the Falklands today these are found in the Cape Meredith complex.  Sand and mud filled and eventually covered the developing continental rifts. Later these sediments covering the rifts hardened into rock. These rock sequences from Gondwana's break-up can be identified in places as far apart as South Africa, western Antarctica and Brazil. In the Falkland Islands, these sequences are known as the West Falkland Group.

Two hundred million years ago, tectonic forces tore Gondwana apart. Sheets of liquid basalt intruded into the cracks that formed between the sedimentary layers. The resulting solidified sheets can now be seen in the form of dikes that cut the oldest sedimentary layers, those that lie principally in the southern part of East Falkland and in South Africa.

Tectonic forces continued to form the region: a mountainous chain formed, part of which now forms Wickham Heights on East Falkland Island and extends westwards through West Falkland into the Jason Islands. A basin developed and was filled with land-based, or terrigenous, sediments. These layers of sand and mud filled the basin as it sank; as they hardened, they produced the rocks of the sedimentary Lafonia Group of the Falklands. These rocks are similar to those in southern Africa's Karoo basin.

Geological structure
The oldest rocks in the Falklands are gneiss and granite in the Cape Meredith complex, which radiometric studies place at around 1100 million years old.  These types of rocks are visible in cliffs at the south end of West Falkland. The Cape Meredith complex corresponds to the crystalline rocks that made up the interior of the Gondwana supercontinent.  This type of rock also has a great geological similarity to rocks currently found in South Africa and in Queen Maud Land in Antarctica.  On top of the gneiss and granite lie layers of quartzite, sandstone, and shales or mudstone in West Falkland. Cross-bedding and ripple marks identify the zone where these rocks were deposited as the shallow waters of a delta environment where currents transported submarine sediments. In the case of the Falklands these palaeocurrent directions mostly run northward, and are very similar to those in formations in South Africa that run southward. Comparison of the two provides evidence that the  block of sandstone sediments that contains the islands has rotated.  Rocks in the central part of West Falkland contain fossils of marine organisms that lived in shallow water.

Formation of basalt dikes
The plain of Lafonia is made of the arenaceous, or sandy, sediments of the Lafonia Group. Depressions in the sediments formed where they were cut  by vertical basalt dikes. The dike is revealed by the erosion of the less resistant rock matrix; this can be observed on Lively Island. In West Falkland there are several dikes that cut the rocks of the West Falkland group, but these dykes, unlike the previous ones, are chemically more unstable and have eroded. The only indication of their existence is the aligned linear depressions. In the margins of these depressions there is evidence of contact baking or hornfels formation adjacent to the once molten basalt dyke.

Folding of West Falkland
Most of the layers of West Falkland and its satellite islands are slightly inclined from the horizontal. This inclination shows different types from rocks in different places. The quartzites of Port Stephens and Stanley are more resistant than the arenaceous sediments of the formation at Fox Bay. The Hornby Mountains, near Falkland Sound have experienced tectonic forces of uplift and folding by which the beds of the West Falkland Group, the Fitzroy Tillite and the Lafonia Group are inclined to the vertical.

Folding of East Falkland
Where East Falkland is underlain by rocks from the West Falkland Group, the rock layers are severely deformed.  The layers are tightly folded with steep to vertical dips. The very soft rocks near the Fox Bay Formation are highly susceptible to erosion.  The hardest quartzites are more resistant and have created a very irregular landscape with steeply inclined rock layers found along the length of the mountain chain on East Falkland from the city of Stanley westward to Wickham Heights.

Glaciation and weathering

The effects of the ice age erosion that occurred in the Pleistocene glaciation between 25,000 and 15,000 years ago are visible in the islands.  The tops of the hills have been exposed to most of the effects of freezing and thawing.  Also, the strong winds that are characteristic of the region carry sand grains up to heights of a metre above ground level; the resulting sand-blasting causes rocks and pillar-shaped rock structures to show the most erosion in their lowest exposed levels, at one metre and below.  This unique pattern of erosion is evident in the higher elevations of West Falkland where quartzites of the Port Stephens Formation are exposed at the surface.  During the last glaciation, snow that accumulated year after year formed glaciers in some elevated leeward zones. These and previous glaciers modified the landscape on the eastern mountain slopes that were protected from the westerly winds.  The reason for glacier accumulation on the eastern slopes could be that the climate could have been very dry, or that the prevailing wind prevented glaciers from forming in places other than eastern slopes.

Another effect of glaciation can be seen on East Falkland in the basins called glacial cirques that were created on Mount Usborne.  On West Falkland there are glacial cirques on Mount Adam and on the Hornby mountains.  Several of these hold tarns, or small cirque ponds.

Rock flows or moraines are another characteristic left by glaciation. In the Falklands, these generally occur only at the mouth of the cirques, although in one valley they extend some 3 km south of the drainage divide that was the likely ice source; north of this same divide, a closer-in moraine loop dams in a small lake.  These moraines are morphologically quite different from the very widespread stone runs, which are the result of periglacial processes.

All the boulders in the stone runs are remnants of quartzites that were repeatedly ground down from repeated weathering, perhaps by a combination of frost action and thermal fatigue. They are found principally in the Port Stanley Beds and to a lesser degree in the Port Stephens Formation.  Excavations show that the colour of the upper parts of the rocks is different from the lower part. This is due to rainwater erosion that has whitened the stones and left them a light grey colour.  Below ground level, where the rocks have been protected from erosion, they acquire an orange colour from iron oxide.

Geological map

Economic geology

Petroleum exploration and reserves 
The petroleum survey area of the Falkland Islands is in the sea to the north of the islands, covers 400,000 km2, and contains several sedimentary  basins from the Mesozoic era. After conducting seismic reflection studies and three-dimensional exploration, six test wells were drilled.  Five of the six wells produced samples of petroleum. However none produced indications of commercial amounts.

According to British Geological Survey studies led by the geologist Phil Richards, the petroleum occurs at 2,700 metres below sea level and a maximum generation would be found beginning at 3,000 metres below sea level. The main petroleum source rocks have still not been penetrated because they are located at a depth deeper than 3,000 metres. It is considered probable that more than 60 billion barrels have been generated, that is, produced by natural forces, in deposits in the North Falkland Basin.

However, even with more conservative figures for the thickness and surface area of the source rock, the rich potential generator of petroleum, it is calculated that significant quantities can be extracted.  For example, in an area of mature rock  and 200 metres thick more than 11.5 billion barrels of petroleum could exist, including the production of 8 kilograms of hydrocarbon per tonne. 

The brown lacustrine sediments are similar to the lacustrine source rocks of the Upper Permian to the south from the Junggar basin, which are among the richest source rocks for oil in the world. According to calculations of the Potential Production Index (obtained when multiplying the organic content of the rock by its thickness and potential production of hydrocarbons) they suggest the rocks of the North Falkland basin are second only to the Junggar basin in  petroleum potential. 

Although the wells indicate a potentially productive source rock, they also indicate that many of the target reservoirs are composed of volcaniclastic rocks with low porosity due to secondary mineralisation and are thus unlikely to store hydrocarbons in large quantities.  This is not an anomalous view based solely on published data from one well, but based on information from multiple sources.  Volcaniclastic-rich deposits are probably present in many parts of the basin, which is to be expected, given the major volcanic sediment source that lay to the west at the time of sedimentary deposition.

Tectonic-stratigraphic structure of the North Falkland Basin: post-exploratory-well analysis

The sedimentary material that fills the north part of North Falkland basin is divided in eight tectonic-stratigraphic geological units.  A geologic unit is a volume of rock or ice of identifiable origin and age that is defined by distinctive characteristics.  At present the biostratigraphic information collected is not sufficient to establish a stratigraphical sequence based on palynological and paleontological data.  Also, the lithostratigraphical units are useful to describe the stratigraphy only of individual wells, but are not useful to make comparisons since there are lateral lithological variations between the units.

The North Falkland basin was where the fluvial-lacustrine (river-lake) deposition took place during the first and last stages of crest formation in the area, which created a permanent lake toward the end of the process of  the subsidence or sinking of the crest. At the end of the formation of the crest, a process of sedimentation occurred that formed various delta systems, creating a large system of lakes.

Toward the end of the tectonic uplift, sedimentation occurred within several deltaic systems in a great system of lakes. Towards the end of the post-uplift phase, from the end of the early Albian or Cenomanian to the beginning of the late Paleocene, the North Falkland basin was characterized by the initial establishment of marginal coastal conditions and finally totally marine conditions, as a marine connection with the basin was formed. In the case of the Falkland basin, the marine conditions began in the early Jurassic and continued in the San Jorge River basin to the northwest, which suggests that marine conditions  spread northwards from the south. The process of uplift in the Paleocene was followed by a process of tectonic subsidence in addition to the marine-deltaic deposition that took place during the rest of the Cenozoic period.

History of petroleum exploration
Geological surveys of the Falklands began in the late 1970s, when two petroleum services companies undertook seismic surveys of the Falklands and the surrounding seafloor.  Although the data appeared to indicate the area was a viable site for exploratory drilling, the islands' government was not prepared to grant licences for drilling.  With the growth of oil extraction in the North Sea, most crude extraction in British waters was confined to the North Sea area.  Some limited surveying did continue, but this was halted entirely following the invasion of the Falkland Islands by Argentina in 1982 and the subsequent conflict.

In 1992 the Falkland Islands government contracted the British Geological Survey to resume geological survey work in the Falklands.  After an initial investigation showed the presence of several Mesozoic basins in the waters surrounding the islands, the first round of exploratory licences was granted covering the most promising of these basins, a fractured basin of elongated shape in relatively shallow waters north of the islands.  Other candidate basins, located to the south and east of the islands, present a greater technological challenge, as they are located in considerably deeper waters.

When the Falkland Islands government granted  licenses in 1996, seven companies agreed upon an exploratory drilling campaign.   Six exploratory wells were drilled as planned for the first five-year period of the licences.

Along with geological and geophysical data obtained during the exploration campaign, environmental data were also gathered.   On the other hand, new investigations in this local were carried out during the drilling campaign and were the object of study in recent years .  Investigations of oil reserves in the Falklands area have continued, but no large-scale extraction has yet commenced.

A new programme of exploratory drilling was scheduled to begin in February 2010 when the Ocean Guardian begins an expected programme of ten exploration wells for Desire Petroleum plc and its associate companies. In 2012 Leiv Eirikson is drilling in the East Falklands Basin.

The petroleum system in the North Falkland Basin
The petroleum exploration discovered a system of source rock in the North Falkland Basin capable of generating more than 102 kg of hydrocarbons per tonne of rock.  Although a great portion of the thickness of the source rock is geologically immature, it is capable of generating hydrocarbons below 2,000 metres.  The rock generating the largest quantity of hydrocarbons is located at a depth of nearly 3,000 metres.  The calculations of the volume of rock that lies just inside the bordering fringe of the petroleum deposit ranges from 36 billion cubic metres to 400 billion cubic metres, depending on the interpretation of the seismic survey data.  In general, it is believed that the basin could have generated up to 60 billion barrels of petroleum.
The petroleum exploration discovered that under the principal interval of source rock is a layer of sandstone approximately 100 metres thick with porosities reaching 30%. Up to now, very few sandstones with good reserve properties have been found in the succession of rifts below the interval of principal source rock, but very few wells have penetrated into this zone.

The absence of high pressure in the basin suggests that whatever quantity of petroleum was produced could have migrated laterally and thus could be trapped in rift reservoirs developed below and to the side of the source rock and could function—given its low level of porosity—as a seal for the deeper rock and would only be cut on the borders where it is intruded upon by faults.

See also
Drainage basin
Depression (geology)
Geological fold
Geologic unit
Lithostratigraphy
Maturity (geology)
Paleontology
Palynology
Petroleum geology
reflection seismology
Sequence stratigraphy
Sedimentary basin
Structural basin
Stone runs

Notes

References
 Aldiss, D. T.  and E. J. Edwards. "The Geology of the Falkland Islands". British Geological Survey Technical Report, WC/99/10. (1999)
 The Falkland Islands, reading the rocks –a geological travelogue (2000), British Geological Survey
 The Falkland Islands, stone runs –rocks in the landscape (2001), British Geological Survey
 Clark, R., E. J. Edwards, S. Luxton, T. Shipp and P. Wilson. "Geology of the Falkland Islands". Geology Today,  11 (1995) 217–223.
 Falkland Islands Government: Offshore Oil Exploration, publication of the Falkland Islands Department of Mineral Research. November 2000.
 Marshall, J. E. A. "The Falkland Islands: a key element in Gondwana palaeography".  Tectonics, 13 (1994) p. 499–514.
 Mitchell, C., Taylor, G.K., Cox, K.G. & Shaw J. 1986. "The Falklands: A rotated microplate?"  Nature, 319, pp 131–134.
 Richards, Phil, "Drilling results from the North Falkland Basin",  Offshore, April 2000, pp. 35–38.
 Rosenbaum, M. "Stone runs in the Falkland Islands" Geology Today, 12, p. 151–154. (1996)
 Storey, B. C.  et al. "Reconstruction and break-out model for the Falkland Islands within Gondwana".  Journal of African Earth Sciences, 29''' (1999) p. 153–163.
 Taylor, G.K. & Shaw, J. 1989. "The Falkland Islands: New paleomagnetic data and their origin as a displaced terrane from Southern Africa". In: Deep structure and past kinematics of accreted terranes'', ed. J.W. Hillhouse, (AGU Monograph 50), 59–72.

External links
 British Geological Survey
Oil exploration map (A3)